Clifton D. (Sonny) Brown is a former American football safety in the National Football League. He played with the Houston Oilers during the 1987 season and was a member of the 1985 National Champions Oklahoma Sooners. Brown was named the MVP of the Orange Bowl in 1986 that earned the Sooners a national championship. He attended high school at Alice High School in Alice, Texas.

NFL career
Due to the players strike, Brown played in only 2 games of the 1987 NFL season and recorded no stats.

External links
NFL.com player page

1963 births
Living people
Sportspeople from Oklahoma City
People from Alice, Texas
American football safeties
Oklahoma Sooners football players
Houston Oilers players